Orthopedic templating is a process wherein surgeons using either acetate templates or digital templates estimate the correct size of the prosthesis to be used in surgery.  The biggest educator on the subject has been AO/ASIF.  In a study published in the Injury journal published in 1998, 94% of consultants and 100% of trainees felt that planning was important but half, respectively, routinely planned fracture treatment.

Since 1996 many companies have developed software to computerize the process, mediCAD® was the first commercially available software, mainly focused on the German market. Other later work includes that of the orthopedic pediatric surgeon Peter Stevens MD from University Of Utah.  The market only truly developed in 2003 when UK based OrthoView was founded by Albany Ventures, and the Israeli-based Orthocrat-TraumaCad which was bootstrapped by an experienced Orthopedic Surgeon Doron Norman MD at the time deputy director of Orthopedics in Rambam Hospital in Haifa and a  software entrepreneur Zeev Glozman.

The main driver of software based orthopedic templating was the introduction of computed radiography (CR) and digital radiography (DR) systems on a mass scale, which in essence eliminated film from the hospital environment, creating the need for digital templating. Unfortunately, eliminating film creates a major flaw when viewing the digital images on a variety of viewing formats. Therefore, a value of known size must be present within the image much like a legend on a map.  The first calibration device has been introduced into the market by Zimmer corporation which consisted of an acrylic bar with two embedded steel balls. OrthoMark and J2 Medicals Akucal were the first devices to use a spherical marker on an articulating and adjustable arm attached to a base which could be placed next to or under a patient. Subsequently, several different OrthoMark models became available with a variety of bases. Some companies copied these devices, among them was Orthocrat-TraumaCad (subsequently Voyant Health, then Brainlab) with what they called VoyantMark. Another adaptation was the development by Mr Richard King of University of Coventry & Warwickshire of a dual marker calibration device dubbed KingMark.

The vast majority of PACS (picture archiving and communication system) providers have partnered with Tel Aviv-based Voyant Health (previously Orthocrat-TraumaCad, now Brainlab, purchased in 2012)  or Southampton-based OrthoView. Some PACS providers such as Sectra, and Medstrat, as well as Cedara have developed templating as part of their PACS solution.
While none of the software packages necessarily address the entire aspect of the surgical tactic, instead focusing on pre-operative implant size selection, the tools prove to be quite usable, convenient, and efficient.

The next step of this technology is making it available on mobile devices such as iPad as well as Android platforms. BrainLab demonstrated its iPad application for Orthopaedic templating at AAOS 2014.

Medstrat envisioned digital templating helping pre-plan cases as a result of the relationship between a Stryker joint rep and his brother-in-law. Orthocrats TraumaCad was founded as a result of patient-doctor relationship between a young rock climber and an orthopedic surgeon. OrthoView was founded in 2003 by Adrian Dwyer, Peter Quinn, and John Chambers as well as an orthopaedic surgeon Grant Shaw of Southampton. It was acquired by Materialise NV in 2014.

As technology moves forward, Artificial Intelligence (AI) made its way to orthopedic templating. PeekMed launched in 2015 an AI-based system, that speeds and automatizes several time-consuming and cumbersome steps by performing automatic bone segmentation, automatic landmark detection, and the automatic planning of the procedure, using the best surgical practices and quick selection of the correction and implants needed. Furthermore, PeekMed allows the surgeon to edit the planning and to simulate different outcomes of the procedure. One of the features of this ultimate technology, automatic orthopedic templating helps the surgeon by automatically placing the most suitable template in the correct position with extreme accuracy.

References

External links
 

Orthopedic treatment